Diogo Gama (born 15 July 1981, in Lisbon) is a Portuguese rugby union player who plays as a centre or as a wing.

Career
Gama was the only member of S.L. Benfica at the Portugal national team that was present at the 2007 Rugby World Cup finals. He played at the 31-5 loss to Italy. He moved to CRC Madrid Noroeste after the event. He returned to Benfica for the 2009–10 season.

Gama had 15 caps for his country, with a try scored, since his debut, at 25 February 2006, with Russia, in a 19–19 draw.

External links
Diogo Gama International Statistics

1981 births
Living people
Rugby union players from Lisbon
Portuguese rugby union players
Rugby union centres
Rugby union wings
S.L. Benfica (rugby union)
Portugal international rugby union players